Robert Rene Joseph Picard (born May 25, 1957) is a Canadian retired professional ice hockey player.

Career
Robert Picard established himself as a highly regarded defensive prospect with the Montreal Juniors and Montreal Bleu Blanc Rouge from 1973 to 1977. He was selected 3rd overall by the Washington Capitals in the 1977 NHL Entry Draft.

In Washington, expectations were high due to the team's abysmal performance, and Picard was expected to single-handedly reverse the losing fortunes. Picard played well, but after three seasons of unrealistic expectations he was traded to Toronto in exchange for goaltender Mike Palmateer. Toronto management gave Picard little opportunity to show what he was capable of, sending him to his hometown Montreal Canadiens in exchange for Michel Larocque in March, 1981. In his hometown, the expectations were raised even higher and, as before, Picard, in his sensitivity, tried to do more than he could.

In 1983, he was traded to the Winnipeg Jets and was paired with fellow defender Randy Carlyle, with whom he found an opportunity to play within his means. The time in Winnipeg was good but short. Just over two seasons later, he was again on the move, this time to the Quebec Nordiques, where he was a regular on the blueline for four seasons before retiring after a 20-game stint with the Red Wings in 1990.

Trivia
On November 4, 1983, Picard was traded to the Winnipeg Jets by the Montreal Canadiens for Winnipeg's 3rd round choice in the 1984 Entry Draft, Montreal would use that draft pick to select goaltender Patrick Roy, who would go on to a Hall of Fame career.

Robert Picard signed with the Capitals after he was drafted with the team’s first choice (third overall) in the 1977 NHL amateur draft. He later realized he could make more money in the World Hockey Association and signed a five-year deal for $625,000 with the WHA’s Quebec Nordiques in Sept., 1977. But the WHA barred Picard from playing with the Nords, realizing that the league would face a lawsuit from the NHL if he suited up. An angry and frustrated Picard said "I’d rather deliver pizzas in Quebec City" than play hockey in Washington. A few days later he reported for his first Capitals training camp.

Career statistics

Regular season and playoffs

International

External links

Profile at hockeydraftcentral.com

1957 births
Living people
Canadian ice hockey defencemen
Detroit Red Wings players
Ice hockey people from Montreal
Montreal Bleu Blanc Rouge players
Montreal Canadiens players
Montreal Juniors players
National Hockey League first-round draft picks
Quebec Nordiques (WHA) draft picks
Quebec Nordiques players
Toronto Maple Leafs players
Washington Capitals draft picks
Washington Capitals players
Winnipeg Jets (1979–1996) players